William Bridgeman (born 12 December 1882 - 1947) was a  professional footballer who played as a forward.

Career

Bridgeman was born in Bromley-by-Bow in 1882. He signed for West Ham United in 1903 making his debut in a 4–1 home defeat to Bristol Rovers on 10 October.

Joining West Ham from local side, Adam and Eve FC, Bridgeman scored West Ham's first ever goal at Upton Park in a 3–0 win against Millwall in September 1904. Folklore has it that he scored all three goals in this game although some references show one of the goals being scored by another player, Jack Flynn.

Bridgeman left West Ham in 1906 to join Chelsea, helping them gain promotion to the First Division in 1912. After 160 games with Chelsea he moved to Southend United, where he ended his footballing career.

References

1882 births
English footballers
West Ham United F.C. players
Chelsea F.C. players
Southend United F.C. players
English Football League players
Association football forwards
1947 deaths
Footballers from Bromley-by-Bow